Amnesty International Nepal (also referred to as Amnesty Nepal or AI Nepal) was founded in Nepal in 1969 by Nutan Thapaliya as an affiliate of the global human rights movement Amnesty International. Two years later, AI Nepal received the status of a "section" at the International Council Meeting (ICM) of Amnesty International in 1971. Due to the difficult environment caused by the repressive Panchyat regime and other difficulties, AI Nepal was dissolved as a Section in 1982. However, the Amnesty movement survived and continued to thrive on in Nepal at the membership level as the very committed members at the groups level continued to engage in different activities to further the AI’s vision in Nepal and elsewhere. After the restoration of democracy in 1990, the AI movement gained further strength in Nepal, and a Coordinating Structure led by Mr Chitra Niraula was constituted by the International Secretariat. The AI movement in Nepal was again recognized as a Section of Amnesty International in 1993. Since then, AI Nepal has been actively engaged in furthering the human rights in Nepal and around the globe by keeping its membership base vibrant, agile and responsive. Currently, AI Nepal has over seven thousand active members affiliated through its various local structures such as Groups and Youth Networks.  

Amnesty Nepal envisions a world where every person enjoys all human rights enshrined in the Universal Declaration of Human Rights as well as within other international human rights standards and norms. In order to achieve this, Amnesty Nepal strives to undertake research and action-focused advocacy campaigns to prevent and end all forms of human rights abuses.

Amnesty Nepal is a constituent of the global community of human rights defenders with values of international solidarity, effective action for victims, global coverage, universality and indivisibility of human rights, and with impartiality and independence as the driving factors in this global movement.

History 
Amnesty International Nepal was founded in 1969 by lawyer Nutan Thapaliya and two years later, it was recognized as a section of Amnesty International, which was founded in London in July 1961 by English barrister Peter Benenson. Benenson was influenced by his friend Louis Blom-Cooper, who led a political prisoners’ campaign.

The Amnesty Nepal section flourished under the leadership of its first chair, late Hrishikesh Shah. However, due to unfavourable situations, Amnesty Nepal was dissolved in 1982. Subsequently, some of Amnesty’s local Groups, still motivated to work alongside human rights issues and strengthen the movement, continued to engage in different activities to further the organization’s vision.

Structure 
Amnesty International Nepal is a membership-based organization. It is entirely made up of voluntary members. The General Assembly is the highest body, which meets annually, called Annual General Meeting (AGM). The AGM is the top-most policy making assembly held on an annual basis. All of Amnesty Groups in Nepal participate in the policy-making process by sending representative/s to the AGM. The AGM guarantees deliberation and dialogue on Amnesty Nepal’s policy, strategy, operational plan, budget, activity report and audited financial report. Similarly, the AGM adopts the by-laws and statutes of the organization. All policies, both internal and external are finalized at the AGM. The AGM is conducted in an open, democratic manner, wherein every two years, the election of the National Board is held. 

The National Board is elected by, and accountable to, the General Assembly. The role of the National Board is to take decisions on behalf of Amnesty Nepal, govern the National Secretariat including groups, implement the strategy laid out by the General Assembly and ensure compliance with the organization's statutes.

The National Secretariat   is responsible for the conduct and daily affairs of Amnesty Nepal under direction from the National Board.

Key Areas 
 Amnesty International primarily targets governments, but also reports on non-governmental bodies and private individuals ("non-state actors").

There are six key areas which Amnesty deals with:

 Women's, children's, minorities' and indigenous rights
 Ending torture
 Abolition of the death penalty
 Rights of refugees
 Rights of prisoners of conscience
 Protection of human dignity.

Campaigns to mobilize public opinion can take the form of individual, country, or thematic campaigns. Many techniques are deployed, such as direct appeals (for example, letter writing), media and publicity work, and public demonstrations. Often, fund-raising is integrated with campaigning. In 2018, the organization started to adopt a new communications strategy based on a message of shared humanity and a hope-based communications approach.

Funding 
Amnesty International Nepal is financed largely by fees and donations from its worldwide membership. It says that it does not accept donations from governments or governmental organizations. According to the AI website,

these personal and unaffiliated donations allow AI to maintain full independence from any and all governments, political ideologies, economic interests or religions. We neither seek nor accept any funds for human rights research from governments or political parties and we accept support only from businesses that have been carefully vetted. By way of ethical fundraising leading to donations from individuals, we are able to stand firm and unwavering in our defence of universal and indivisible human rights.

However, AI has received grants over the past ten years from some governments but these funds are only used "in support of its human rights education work."

References 

 
Human rights organizations
Human rights organisations based in Nepal
1969 establishments in Nepal